The Easy Chain (2008) is the second novel by the American writer Evan Dara.

It tells the story of Lincoln Selwyn, the son of British parents who grows up in the Netherlands and, following a period of aimless wandering in his 20s, decides to attend the University of Chicago due to its rigorous curriculum. However, after one semester at school, he "quickly climbs the social ladder to become one of the most influential people in the city, but he just as suddenly disappears, leaving no trace of his whereabouts."  The back cover summarizes his journey by saying, "Over the last nine months, this charismatic blond with the irresistible accent vaulted to the top of the city's social hierarchy, slept with the majority of its first daughters and racked up an unimaginable fortune."

"It’s a standard enough plot for a novel, except readers familiar with The Lost Scrapbook will know going in that almost nothing about a Dara novel is standard—or easy. The magic of his writing and what he accomplishes through it is, despite its difficulty, obscurity, density, and abstractness, manifested in how mesmerizing, hypnotizing, and just plain readable Evan Dara is."

Two of the more unusual aspects of the novel are the 40-page break midway through the book, which are blank save for a smattering of dashes, words, and ellipses, as well as a 60-page section written in rhythmic and repetitive verse.

Translation 
In 2019, the Spanish house Pálido Fuego published a translation of The Easy Chain, entitled La cadena fácil. Critical reaction to the book was very positive, with Mariano Hortal offering it up as one of his 32 book recommendations for the fall. Hortal wrote:

"Una historia exigente y compleja que volverá a deleitar a aquellos que buscamos retos a la hora de afrontar obras distintas y que sean diferentes de la media. Aquí no nos va faltar nada de eso. Me temo que puede ser una de las obras del año" ("A demanding and complex story that will delight those who seek challenges when facing different works and that are different from the average. We are not going to miss any of that. I fear it may be one of the works of the year.")

Writing in El Plural, Jose Angel Barrueco concludes his review of the book ("una de las novelas más sólidas e imaginativas del año") by writing:"Esta crítica hacia las imposturas y hacia las falsedades del mundo contemporáneo Evan Dara las introduce o las camufla mediante la sátira y merced a unos personajes al borde del delirio oral, quienes a veces ensartan en sus circunloquios y en sus comentarios algunas sentencias asombrosas. Si en la primera mitad del libro tenemos claro lo que sucede, en la segunda las narraciones se vuelven más difusas, y, si en algunos pasajes sabemos lo que sucede (por ejemplo, cuando Lincoln busca a su madre en Europa), en otros sólo obtenemos leves indicios (por ejemplo, en la especie de canción o poema con versos repetidos). Pero en realidad da igual: lo que importa es la cadencia, el ritmo, las técnicas que utiliza Dara. Si la primera parte nos suena a William Gaddis, en la segunda casi podemos sentir la sombra de James Joyce y sus múltiples técnicas de Ulises."

Translation: "This criticism of the impostures and the falsehoods of the contemporary world Evan Dara introduces or camouflages them through satire and thanks to some characters on the verge of oral delirium, who sometimes skewer some amazing sentences in their circumlocutions and in their comments. If in the first half of the book we are clear about what happens, in the second half the narratives become more diffuse, and, if in some passages we know what happens (for example, when Lincoln looks for his mother in Europe), in others only we get slight clues (for example, in the kind of song or poem with repeated verses). But it doesn't really matter: what matters is the cadence, the rhythm, the techniques that Dara uses. If the first part sounds like William Gaddis, in the second we can almost feel the shadow of James Joyce and his many techniques of Ulysses."

See also 
Isaiah Eleven (2008) novel set in Chicago

References 

2008 American novels
Novels set in Chicago
Novels set in Illinois
Novels set in Amsterdam
Metafictional novels
Postmodern novels
American philosophical novels